Dagenais is a surname. Notable people with the surname include:

Camille Dagenais (1920–2016), Canadian engineer
Kati Dagenais (born 1969), Canadian musher
Pierre Dagenais (born 1978), Canadian ice hockey player
Sarah Dagenais-Hakim, Canadian actress and singer
Todd Dagenais (born 1970), American college volleyball coach, former player and author

See also
Dagenais v Canadian Broadcasting Corp